John Lee (31 March 1928 – 21 December 2000) was an Australian actor with an extensive career in film and television in Australia as well as the United Kingdom and the United States.

He is remembered for his roles on television, including Andrew Reynolds in Prisoner, Inspector Ian Timms in Cop Shop, Len Mangel in Neighbours and Philip Stewart in Return to Eden.

He also worked in the United Kingdom throughout the 1960s and 1970s, appearing in series such as The Avengers, The Troubleshooters, Doomwatch, Marked Personal, Warship, Survivors and Wilde Alliance. He played Alydon in the 1963–64 Doctor Who serial The Daleks

Filmography

Film

Television

External links

1928 births
2000 deaths
Australian male film actors
Australian male soap opera actors
People from Launceston, Tasmania
20th-century Australian male actors